Antiplanes yukiae is a species of sea snail, a marine gastropod mollusc in the family Pseudomelatomidae.

The generic position of this species remains unresolved. It is provisionally kept in Antiplanes.

Distribution
This marine species occurs off Japan.

References

 Shikama T., 1962: On some noteworthy marine Gastropoda from off Choshi;Chiba Prefecture,  Sci. Rep. Yok.  Nat. Univ., sec. 2 , n. 8
 Hasegawa K. & Okutani T. (2011) A review of bathyal shell-bearing gastropods in Sagami Bay. Memoirs of the National Sciences Museum, Tokyo 47: 97-144. [15 April 2011]

External links
 

yukiae
Gastropods described in 1962